Katharina Baunach (born 18 January 1989) is a German former footballer who played as a defender or midfielder. She was first called up to play in the German national team in February 2009.

Honours
Bayern München
 Frauen-Bundesliga: 2014–15, 2015–16
 DFB-Pokal: 2011–12
 Bundesliga Cup: 2011

VfL Wolfsburg
Frauen-Bundesliga: 2017–18, 2018–19
DFB-Pokal: 2017–18, 2018–19
UEFA Women's Champions League runner-up : 2017–18

International
 U-16 Nordic Cup: 2005
 U-19 European Championship: 2007
 FIFA U-20 Women's World Cup third place: 2008

Individual
Fritz Walter Medal Silver: 2007

References

External links
 Profile at Bayern Munich

1989 births
Living people
German women's footballers
FC Bayern Munich (women) players
VfL Wolfsburg (women) players
Frauen-Bundesliga players
Sportspeople from Würzburg
Women's association football midfielders
Footballers from Bavaria
West Ham United F.C. Women players
Women's Super League players
German expatriate sportspeople in England
Expatriate women's footballers in England
Germany women's international footballers